Köprübaşı is a town and district of Trabzon Province in the Black Sea region of Turkey. The mayor is Ahmet Tekke (AKP).

References

External links

Populated places in Trabzon Province
Districts of Trabzon Province